The Inexhaustible Cab (1899) is a British short film that was directed by George Albert Smith. Released in the US by S Lubin and Edison Manufacturing Company 29 June 1901.

Plot
A cab is stopped by a man so that several people can be driven to another part of the city.  A clown jumps out of the cab and gets all of the people into it, except for an overweight nurse who is carrying a child and is also 400 pounds. The clown takes the child from her and throws it on top of the cab and then the clown uses a board to force the nurse possibly named Bridget into the cab.

External links
IMDB

1899 films
1899 comedy films
1890s British films
British black-and-white films
British silent short films
Films directed by George Albert Smith
British comedy short films
Silent comedy films